Kurtar may refer to:
 Kurtar, Iran
 Güvenç Kurtar, Turkish football manager
 İsmail Cem Kurtar, Turkish volleyball player

Turkish-language surnames